In abstract algebra (specifically commutative ring theory), Faltings' annihilator theorem states: given a finitely generated module M over a Noetherian commutative ring A and ideals I, J, the following are equivalent:
 for any ,
there is an ideal  in A such that  and  annihilates the local cohomologies ,
provided either A has a dualizing complex or is a quotient of a regular ring.

References 

Abstract algebra
Commutative algebra